War Profiteering Is Killing Us All is the sixth studio album by the Detroit, Michigan punk rock band The Suicide Machines, released in 2005 by Side One Dummy Records. The band broke up the following year while touring in support of the album. The album's artwork and many of its songs are critical of President George W. Bush's administration and the Iraq War. Musically, the album explores the ska punk and hardcore styles the band was known for, with short, aggressive songs dealing mostly with social and political topics. A music video was filmed for the single "War Profiteering is Killing Us All".

Track listing
All songs written by The Suicide Machines

Personnel
Jason Navarro – vocals
Dan Lukacinsky – guitar, backing vocals
Rich Tschirhart – bass, backing vocals
Ryan Vandeberghe – drums

Album information
Record label: Side One Dummy Records
Produced by Bill Stevenson and Jason Livermore with The Suicide Machines
All songs written by The Suicide Machines
Recorded and mixed in April 2005 at The Blasting Room in Fort Collins, Colorado
Mixed by Jason Livermore and Bill Stevenson
Additional engineering by Andrew Berlin and Brian Kephart
Mastered by Brian Gardener at Bernie Grundman Mastering in Hollywood, California
Paintings by Jime Litwalk
Design by Steve and Rich Tschirhart

The Suicide Machines albums
SideOneDummy Records albums
2005 albums
Albums produced by Bill Stevenson (musician)